Kabiskagami Lake is a lake in the Lake Superior drainage basin in Algoma District, Ontario, Canada. The primary outflow is an unnamed creek to Mosambik Lake on the Magpie River, which flows into Lake Superior.

See also
List of lakes in Ontario

References

Lakes of Algoma District